This article shows statistics of individual players for the football club Dinamo Zagreb It also lists all matches that Dinamo Zagreb played in the 2001–02 season.

Players

Squad
(Correct as of September 2001)

Goalscorers

Competitions

Overall

Prva HNL

Classification

Results summary

Results by round

Results by opponent

Source: 2001–02 Prva HNL article

Matches

Competitive

Last updated 4 May 2002Sources:

External links
 Dinamo Zagreb official website

GNK Dinamo Zagreb seasons
Dinamo Zagreb